Diego Reyes Muñoz (born 21 July 1979 in Chiclana de la Frontera, Cádiz) is a Spanish retired professional footballer who played as a left back.

External links

Stats and bio at Cadistas1910 

1979 births
Living people
People from Chiclana de la Frontera
Sportspeople from the Province of Cádiz
Spanish footballers
Footballers from Andalusia
Association football defenders
Segunda División players
Segunda División B players
Tercera División players
Real Betis players
CD San Fernando players
AD Ceuta footballers
Gimnàstic de Tarragona footballers
Córdoba CF players
CD Castellón footballers
Cádiz CF players
UD Salamanca players